Acacitli (Nahuatl for "reed hare") was a Mexica chief and one of the "founding fathers" of Tenochtitlan, the capital of the Aztec Empire.

According to the Crónica mexicayotl, his daughter Tezcatlan Miyahuatzin was married to Acamapichtli, the first tlatoani of Tenochtitlan, and gave birth to King Huitzilihuitl.

See also

List of Tenochtitlan rulers

Notes

References

External links

Aztec nobility
Year of birth unknown
Year of death unknown
Nobility of the Americas